Sir Thomas Langton (1496/97–1569), of Newton and Walton-le-Dale, Lancashire, was an English politician.

He was a Member (MP) of the Parliament of England for Lancashire in April 1554.

References

1490s births
1569 deaths
English MPs 1554
Members of the Parliament of England (pre-1707) for Lancashire